Marcel Ohmann (born April 4, 1991) is a German professional ice hockey player. He is currently an unrestricted free agent who most recently played for the Grizzlys Wolfsburg of the Deutsche Eishockey Liga (DEL).

Ohmaan previously played 8 seasons with Kölner Haie in the DEL. As a free agent following the 2016–17 season, Ohmann left Cologne after 8 professional years, signing a one-year deal with fellow German club, Grizzlys Wolfsburg on May 10, 2017.

After concluding his second season with the Grizzlys in 2018–19, Ohmann opted to leave as a free agent on March 8, 2019.

References

External links

1991 births
Living people
German ice hockey left wingers
Fischtown Pinguins players
Kölner Haie players
Grizzlys Wolfsburg players
Sportspeople from Neuss
21st-century German people